O Astro is a Brazilian telenovela produced and broadcast by TV Globo. It premiered on 6 December 1977 and ended on 7 July 1978, with a total of 185 episodes. It's the twentieth "novela das oito" to be aired on the timeslot. It is created and written by Janete Clair and directed by Daniel Filho and Gonzaga Blota.

Cast

References

External links 
 

TV Globo telenovelas
1977 telenovelas
Brazilian telenovelas
1977 Brazilian television series debuts
1978 Brazilian television series endings
Brazilian LGBT-related television shows
Portuguese-language telenovelas